Ligusticum striatum (syn. L. wallichii) is a flowering plant native to India, Kashmir, and Nepal in the carrot family best known for its use in traditional Chinese medicine where it is considered one of the 50 fundamental herbs. It is known by the common name Szechuan lovage. It contains the phytoprogestogens 3,8-dihydrodiligustilide and riligustilide.

Uses
Along with Ligusticum wallichii, L. striatum is one of the possible herbs used to make the Chinese Traditional Medicine chuānxiōng

It is used in China, with portions of other plants and herbs (such as monkshood and Rosa banksiae) to make a liniment to treat a painful swelling of the joints.

It can be used to treat ischemic strokes, improve brain microcirculation and inhibit thrombus formation and platelet aggregation.

References

striatum
Plants used in traditional Chinese medicine
Flora of China
Flora of West Himalaya
Flora of Nepal